Reichenau may refer to:

Reichenau Island, a German island in Lake Constance
Reichenau Abbey, a former Benedictine monastery on the island
Reichenau, Baden-Württemberg, a municipality that encompasses the namesake island and five separate areas on the mainland
Reichenau, Switzerland, part of the municipality Tamins, in Grisons, Switzerland
Reichenau, Carinthia, a municipality in Carinthia, Austria
Reichenau an der Rax, a municipality in Lower Austria, Austria
Reichenau im Mühlkreis, a municipality in Upper Austria, Austria
The Polish town of Bogatynia, which until 1945 was the German town of Reichenau
The Polish village of Topola, Lower Silesian Voivodeship, which until 1945 was the German village of Reichenau
The Czech town of Rychnov u Jablonce nad Nisou, historically named Reichenau in German
The Czech town of Rychnov nad Kněžnou, historically named Reichenau an der Knieschna in German
The Czech town of Rychnov na Moravě, historically named Reichenau in German
The Gottschee village of Rajhenav, known as Reichenau in German

People with the surname
Hermann of Reichenau, 11th century scholar, composer, music theorist, mathematician, historian, and astronomer
Walther von Reichenau, a World War II German field marshal

German-language surnames